Madan Lal is  an Indian athlete. He won a gold medal in shot put in the 1951 Delhi Asian games.

References

Indian male shot putters
Asian Games medalists in athletics (track and field)
Athletes (track and field) at the 1951 Asian Games
Asian Games gold medalists for India
Medalists at the 1951 Asian Games
Possibly living people
Year of birth missing